Beniamino Abate (born 10 April 1962) is an Italian former professional footballer who played as goalkeeper. He is currently the goalkeeping coach of the Milan Primavera (under-19) squad. He is the father of Ignazio Abate who played as right-back for Milan.

Playing career
During his career, Abate played in Serie C1 with Benevento, in Serie A with Udinese, Internazionale and Cagliari, as well as in Serie B with Reggiana, where ended his career. In Serie A, he played a total of 67 matches.

During his time with Inter, he was included on the bench for the first leg of the victorious 1994 UEFA Cup Final (Raffaele Nuzzo was on the bench for the second leg).

Managerial career
Abate currently works in the A.C. Milan youth sector as a goalkeeping coach and was previously a scout.

Honours
Internazionale
UEFA Cup: 1993–94

References

1962 births
Living people
Sportspeople from the Province of Avellino
Italian footballers
Association football goalkeepers
Serie A players
Serie B players
Benevento Calcio players
S.S.C. Napoli players
Udinese Calcio players
A.C.R. Messina players
Inter Milan players
S.S. Fidelis Andria 1928 players
Cagliari Calcio players
A.C. Reggiana 1919 players
UEFA Cup winning players
Footballers from Campania
A.C. Milan non-playing staff